Silver diethyldithiocarbamate is a chemical compound.  It is the silver salt of diethylthiocarbamic acid.

Preparation
Silver diethyldithiocarbamate can be prepared by mixing a solution sodium diethyldithiocarbamate with a solution of silver nitrate. A precipitate forms immediately and can be filtered to isolate from the rest of the mixture. The solid should then be rinsed with hot water in order to remove the residual acid salt that will be present.

Application
Silver diethyldithiocarbamate can be applied to introduce the diethyldithiocarbamato ligand to a coordination compound. Silver diethyldithiocarbamate can also be used to detect Nitrogen monooxide in the brain and other tissue. These applications are similar to the applications of sodium diethyldithiocarbamate, which is more practical to use from a synthetic and toxicological perspective.

Determination of arsenic concentration

The solubility of silver diethyldithiocarbamate, compared to sodium diethyldithiocarbamate, allows it to be used to determine arsenic concentrations in water. Silver diethyldithiocarbamate dissolved in pyridine appears as an intensely yellow-colored solution. Arsenic ions are transferred to an arsine generating flask and diluted with water. Sulfuric acid, potassium iodide solution, and stannous chloride dihydrate are diluted in a solution of concentrated hydrochloric acid and mixed. The apparatus is plugged loosely with lead acetate wool, which acts as a Scrubbing. The pyridine and silver diethyldithiocarbamate solution is added to the tube and serves as the absorber solution. Granulated zinc is added to the arsine generator flask, which will result in the production of hydrogen because of the presence of acid. The arsine is carried through the tube by the generated hydrogen gas. The arsine reacts with the silver diethyldithiocarbamate solution and forms red-colored products (535 nm). Ultraviolet-visible spectroscopy can be used to determine the concentration of arsenic can be calculated based on Beer's Law.

The red product is a result of arsine bubbling through the silver diethyldithiocarbamate solution and there are two likely products responsible for the color change. One is arsenic substituting the silver in diethyldithiocarbamate, resulting a coordination compound in which three diethyldithiocarbamate ligands are bound to an As atom (Figure 1). The other product is a result of the reduction of silver diethyldithiocarbamate (Figure 2). 

This method for determination of arsenic concentration is applicable to not only waste water and mineral water but also petroleum, the human body, various foods and ores, and pyrolysis gasses. There have all been reports of silver diethyldithiocarbamate being modified into an electrode to be used for similar purposes.

This method of determining arsenic levels in water is compared to the Gutzeit procedure and has the advantages of faster hydrogen gas absorption and more objective color interpretation.

References

Dithiocarbamates
Silver compounds